William Lee (1812–1891) was an English civil and sanitary engineer. He is now best known in his role as biographer and bibliographer of Daniel Defoe.

Life

He was born in Sheffield, and became Surveyor of Highways. He was one of the inspectors recruited by Edwin Chadwick in promoting his General Board of Health.

Lee was Secretary of the Sheffield Literary and Philosophical Society from 1845 to 1850. John Holland was a friend.

Work on Defoe
He wrote numerous contributions to Notes and Queries on Defoe:
http://english.illinoisstate.edu/digitaldefoe/multimedia/leeservitude.pdf
http://english.illinoisstate.edu/digitaldefoe/multimedia/leemoralvii.pdf
http://english.illinoisstate.edu/digitaldefoe/multimedia/leev.pdf
http://english.illinoisstate.edu/digitaldefoe/multimedia/leevii.pdf
http://english.illinoisstate.edu/digitaldefoe/multimedia/leeviii.pdf

George Saintsbury found Lee's attributions impressionistic; they brought the number of works credited to Defoe to 254, of which 64 were novel attributions. William Peterfield Trent wrote that Lee's researches were set off by the discovery of correspondence showing that Defoe had worked as a government agent. Furbank and Owens state that Lee was motivated by the dislike he had for the radical Defoe portrayed by Walter Wilson.

Other works
On Modern Carriageways: Being a Paper Read Before The Sheffield Literary and Philosophical Society, on Friday, November 3, 1843 (1843)

External links
Table of 19th-century critical work on Defoe (PDF)
http://english.illinoisstate.edu/digitaldefoe/multimedia/date.html
rogerwilliams.net

Notes

1812 births
1891 deaths
English civil engineers
English bibliographers